A Different Kind of Tension is the third studio album by English punk rock band Buzzcocks. It was released in September 1979 by record label United Artists.

It charted at number 26 in the United Kingdom and number 163 in the United States.

Recording and production
A Different Kind of Tension, under the guidance of English record producer Martin Rushent and the management of Richard Boon, was recorded at Eden Studios, mixed at Genetic Sound, mastered by George Peckham at Portland Recording Studio, and published worldwide in vinyl LP format in 1979 and 1980 through United Artists Records, EMI, and I.R.S. Records. The album was subsequently reissued many times, and first released in CD format in 1989 by I.R.S. featuring the 1981 6-track promo EP Pts. 1–3. This same version was remastered in 1992. In 2008 (Europe) and 2010 (US) EMI and Mute Records released a 2-CD remastered version of the album featuring its associated singles, demo recordings, and the band John Peel's BBC Radio 1 shows of 23 November 1978 (recorded on 18 November 1978) and 28 May 1979 (recorded on 21 May 1979).

Album cover
The sleeve features a photograph of the band by Jill Furmanovsky amongst a montage of triangles. This continued the artistic theme established by Malcolm Garrett on the covers of Another Music in a Different Kitchen (squares) and Love Bites (circles).

Critical reception 

In a contemporary review of A Different Kind of Tension, Mikal Gilmore of Rolling Stone felt that the album suffered from repetitiveness, "resulting in a catchall of reworked riffs and static, similar tempos", while nonetheless praising it as their "most formidable record yet". In a retrospective review, Rolling Stones Jon Dolan called A Different Kind of Tension the best of the band's first three albums. In Uncut, David Cavanagh observed that the album was divided between an unsurprisingly punk-flavoured first half and an experimental second half which harkened to the future.

Track listing

Personnel
Buzzcocks
 Pete Shelley – guitar (left channel), vocals, keyboards
 Steve Diggle – guitar (right channel), vocals
 Steve Garvey – bass guitar
 John Maher – drums
Technical
 Martin Rushent – producer/engineer
 Nick Froome – second engineer
 George Peckham – mastering
 Richard Boon – management
 Malcolm Garrett – artwork
 Kevin Cummins – photography (Shelley)
 Jill Furmanovsky – photography (group)
 Peter Monks – photography (Maher)
 Gervaise Soeurouge – photography (Garvey)
 Judith Wrightson – photography (Diggle)

Charts

References

External links

1979 albums
Buzzcocks albums
Albums produced by Martin Rushent
United Artists Records albums
I.R.S. Records albums
Nettwerk Records albums